Doug Robinson is an American media executive and producer.

Biography
Robinson was born to a Jewish family. In 1985, he graduated with a double major in television-radio-film and marketing management from Syracuse University's S. I. Newhouse School of Public Communications. After school, he moved to California and worked as an agent for Creative Artists Agency and Endeavor Talent Agency after which, leveraging his network of contacts in the industry, began producing on his own. In 2002, Robinson was appointed the head of TV at Adam Sandler's Happy Madison Productions. He produced Rules of Engagement for CBS, Imaginary Mary, and The Goldbergs for ABC. In 2017, Robinson signed a four-year agreement with Sony Pictures Television that will have him launch his own production company, Doug Robinson Productions (DRP). He will be joined by producer Alison Greenspan who will focus on development of dramas; and Matt Mosko who will focus on producing comedies. In September 2017, DRP sold its first family comedy series to ABC.

Filmography 
 Rules of Engagement (2007–13)
 Pretend Time (2010–11)
 Breaking In (2011–12)
 The Goldbergs (2013–present)
 Imaginary Mary (2017)
 Schooled (2019–20)
 Indebted (2020)
 For Life (2020–present)

References

External links

Robinson on 'Cuse Conversations Podcast in 2020

Year of birth missing (living people)
Living people
Film producers from New York (state)
American Jews
American talent agents
S.I. Newhouse School of Public Communications alumni